John Agmondeham (c. 1511 – 1573), of Rowbarns, East Horsley, Surrey, was an English politician.

Biography
He was a son of Henry Agmondesham by his wife Elizabeth. He married Margaret, daughter of William Everard of Albourne, Sussex, and had two sons, one of which was John II, and 1 daughter. 

He was a Member (MP) of the Parliament of England for Reigate in 1571.

References

1511 births
1573 deaths
English MPs 1571
People from Surrey